"Good-Bye Bad Times" is a song by British singer and songwriter Philip Oakey and Italian producer Giorgio Moroder. It was written by Oakey and Moroder and recorded for the album Philip Oakey & Giorgio Moroder. Released as a single in the UK in June 1985 as the follow-up to Oakey and Moroder's 1984 hit "Together in Electric Dreams", it reached number 44 on the singles charts and remained on the charts for 5 weeks. It was moderately successful in Australia, where it peaked at number 26.

Virgin Records had high expectations for the single but it failed to sell in the quantities forecast. After a final single, "Be My Lover Now", the short partnership between Oakey and Moroder effectively ended. Oakey then returned to work with his band the Human League full-time.

Music video

The music video for "Good-Bye Bad Times" was quite a high budget production as Virgin Records had high expectations for the song after the huge international success of "Together in Electric Dreams". It was filmed in black and white, directed by Steve Barron and has a Victoriana theme. It is set in 19th century London and features unrequited love between a city gent and a pretty working-class girl. Oakey features inset in the early scenes and later as a singer in the background of a music hall dressed in Victorian attire. 
A paradox of the video is that the modern music is completely at odds with the scenery and story board.

Charts and certifications

Weekly charts

References

External links
http://www.the-black-hit-of-space.dk/goodbye_bad_times.htm

1985 songs
1985 singles
Philip Oakey songs
Giorgio Moroder songs
Songs written by Giorgio Moroder
Songs written by Philip Oakey
Song recordings produced by Giorgio Moroder
Virgin Records singles